Sportback is a term used by Audi for 5-door hatchback/fastback/coupe SUV models. It is also used on some non-Audi cars such as the Mitsubishi Lancer Sportback.

Audi models
A1 Sportback
A3 Sportback
A5 Sportback
A7 Sportback
Sportback concept
Q3 Sportback
Q5 Sportback
Q8 e-tron Sportback

Non-Audi models

Mitsubishi Lancer Sportback

Set index articles on cars